St. Paul's railway station, also known as Halifax St. Paul's, served  the St. Paul's area of Halifax, West Yorkshire, England on the Halifax High Level Railway.

History

It was one of two stations on the short lived Halifax High Level Railway, which was built to serve the west side of Halifax. The station opened on 5 September 1890. The line had been originally been proposed to go straight through to Huddersfield however the plan was abandoned in 1887. The branch and its two stations closed to passengers on 1 January 1917 as a wartime economy measure. However, they were reinstated after the war, but withdrawn again on 1 January 1927 due to the introduction of electric trams to Halifax.

Route

References

External links
 St. Pauls station (shown closed) on navigable 1947 O. S. map

Disused railway stations in Calderdale
Former Halifax High Level Railway stations
Railway stations in Great Britain opened in 1890
Railway stations in Great Britain closed in 1917